Oxybelus uniglumis is a species of square-headed wasp in the family Crabronidae. It is found in Europe and Northern Asia (excluding China) and Southern Asia.

References

External links

 

Crabronidae
Articles created by Qbugbot
Wasps described in 1758
Taxa named by Carl Linnaeus